The Jemima Wilkinson House, also known as the Friend's Home, is a historic home located at Jerusalem in Yates County, New York. It is a five-bay, -story Federal-style residence built about 1809–1815. It is named after the preacher known as the Public Universal Friend, whose previous name was Jemima Wilkinson.

It was listed on the National Register of Historic Places in 1994.

References

Houses on the National Register of Historic Places in New York (state)
Federal architecture in New York (state)
Houses in Yates County, New York
National Register of Historic Places in Yates County, New York